Tony Thulani "TT" Tsabedze (born 29 October 1984) is a Liswati footballer who plays as a midfielder for Mbabane Swallows and the Eswatini national football team.

Career
Tsabedze played domestically for Mhlambanyatsi Rovers before playing professionally in South Africa, appearing in the Premier Soccer League for Silver Stars, Supersport United, Maritzburg United, Engen Santos and Mbabane Swallows. He played for Swaziland in 2017 Africa Cup of Nations qualifying, scoring twice in a 2–1 victory over Guinea on 23 July 2015.

International goals
Scores and results list Eswatini's goal tally first.

References

External links

1984 births
Living people
Swazi expatriate footballers
Swazi footballers
Eswatini international footballers
Association football midfielders
SuperSport United F.C. players
Swazi expatriate sportspeople in South Africa
Maritzburg United F.C. players
Platinum Stars F.C. players
Santos F.C. (South Africa) players
Mbabane Swallows players
Expatriate soccer players in South Africa
South African Premier Division players
People from Manzini Region